There are many places of worship in Calgary.

List
 The Gospel Faith Mission International (GOFAMINT Throne of Grace Assembly, Calgary) HTTP://www.throneofgraceassembly.org
 Downtown Calgary Mosque
Islamic Centre of South Calgary
Green Dome Mosque
Abu Bakr Islamic Centre
Maryam Masjid
Islamic Rahma Mosque
Bilal Islamic Centre
Bait-ul Mukarram Islamic Centre Calgary
Osmania Masjid and Musallah
Al Rehma Mosque
Al-Hedaya Islamic Centre
Faizan-e Madina Islamic Centre
Islamic Information Society of Calgary (IISC)
Akram Jomma Masjid
South West Masjid
Bridgeland Musalla
Shia Muslim Association of Calgary (Imambargah)
Anjuman E Vajihi- Dawoodi Bohra Community Hall
Baitun Nur, a mosque of the Ahmadiyya Muslim Community in the Castleridge community
 BAPS Shri Swaminarayan Mandir, Calgary
 Calgary Alberta Temple, a temple of the Church of Jesus Christ of Latter-day Saints, dedicated October 28, 2012
 Cathedral Church of the Redeemer, the seat of the Anglican Diocese of Calgary
Centre Street Church, a member church of the Evangelical Missionary Church of Canada (EMCC) and largest megachurch in Canada
 Knox United Church, a member church of the United Church of Canada
 St. Mary's Cathedral, a Roman Catholic cathedral
 St. Patrick's Roman Catholic Church, a historic Carpenter Gothic-style Roman Catholic church

References

 
Places of worship
Calgary, places of worship
Calgary
Calgary